Seini (German: Leuchtenburg; Hungarian: Szinérváralja) is a town in Maramureș County, Romania. It administers two villages, Săbișa (Kissebespatak) and Viile Apei (Apahegy). It officially became a town in 1989, as a result of the Romanian rural systematization program.

References

Populated places in Maramureș County
Towns in Romania